Balla railway station served the village of Balla in County Mayo, Ireland.

History
Opened by the Great Northern and Western Railway, the station was then nationalised, passing on to the Córas Iompair Éireann as a result of the Transport Act 1944 which took effect from 1 January 1945.

Today
Trains on the Dublin Heuston to Westport still pass the site. Newspaper reports in December 2021 reported on the reopening of the station in the event of a reopening of the Western Rail Corridor from Galway to Sligo.

References 

 
 

Disused railway stations in County Mayo
Railway stations opened in 1862
Railway stations closed in 1963
1862 establishments in Ireland
Railway stations in the Republic of Ireland opened in the 19th century